Qincheng  is a town-level administrative unit under the jurisdiction of Nanfeng County, Fuzhou City, Jiangxi Province, People's Republic of China.  As of 2017, it has 7 residential communities and 14 villages under its administration.

Administrative Divisions 
Qincheng administers the following villages and communities: 

Communities:

 Renmin
 Jiefang 
 Jianshe
 Xinjian 
 Cangshan 
 Orange 
 East Orange 

Villages:

 West Dabao 
 Xiafang 
 Shuibei 
 Qiaobei 
 Xujiabian 
 Maodian 
 Fuxi 
 Youjun 
 Aiyuan 
 Yaopu 
 Shuinan 
 Yangmei 
 Orchard Village
 Chaoxian

References 

Township-level divisions of Jiangxi
Nanfeng County